The Colorama was a large photographic display located on the east balcony inside New York City's Grand Central Terminal from 1950 to 1990, with 565 being made. The photographs were described as "The World's Largest Photographs".

References 

 George Eastman House Collection, Colorama: The World's Largest Photographs, Aperture Foundation, New York, 2004. .

External links

 Colorama: The Stories Behind the Pictures Documentary Site

Photography exhibitions
Advertising in the United States
Kodak
Grand Central Terminal